Eslamabad-e Chah Narenj (also Romanized as Eslāmābād-e Chāh Nārenj; also known as Eslāmābād) is a village in Hur Rural District, in the Central District of Faryab County, Kerman Province, Iran. At the 2006 census, its population was 872, in 200 families.

References 

Populated places in Faryab County